Meller-Zakomelsky or Möller-Sakomelski/Sakomelsky is a Russian surname of German and noble origins. It may refer to:

Alexander Meller-Zakomelsky (1844–1928) — Imperial Russian Governor of Livonia and General
Ivan Möller-Sakomelsky (1725–1790) — General of the Russian Empire

See also
Meller

Russian noble families
Compound surnames
Russian-language surnames
Surnames of German origin